Bihar is a state in East India. It is bounded by Uttar Pradesh to the west, Nepal to the north, West Bengal to the east and Jharkhand to the south. About 7% of the state is protected forest area.

Geography
Bihar has notified forest area of 6,764.14 km², which is 7.1 percent of its geographical area.

The sub-Himalayan foothills of the Someshwar and Dun mountain ranges in West Champaran district are clad in a belt of moist deciduous forest. As well as trees, this consists of scrub, grass and reeds. Here the annual  rainfall is above 1,600 mm and this promotes luxuriant sal forests (Shorea robusta) in the favoured areas.
Bihar has 3,208 km2 (~3.41%) of Protected Forest Area and 76.30 km 2 of Protected Non-Forest Area.
Bihar is one of the states that has taken "considerable" steps to implement the "Scheduled Tribes and Traditional Forest Dwellers (Recognition of Forest Rights) Act, 2006".

Protected areas

See also
 Flora of Bihar
 Fauna of Bihar
 Protected areas of India
 List of Zoos in India

References

External links
 Department of Environment & Forest, Bihar'
 Ministry of Forests - List of protected areas in India

 
Lists of tourist attractions in Bihar